Piano in the Background is an album by American pianist, composer and bandleader Duke Ellington recorded and released on the Columbia label in 1960.

Reception
The Allmusic review by Thom Jurek awarded the album 4 stars and stated "designed to showcase a series of new arrangements for the Ellington Orchestra, it also offers the composer and bandleader as a pianist leading the band... In all, this and the two discs that were reissued as companions to this one, Piano in the Foreground and Blues in Orbit, mark a highly creative and productive time in Ellington's long career".

Track listing
:All compositions by Duke Ellington except as indicated
 "Happy Go Lucky Local" - 3:02  
 "What Am I Here For" (Duke Ellington, Frankie Laine) - 4:08  
 "Medley: Kinda Dukish/Rockin' in Rhythm" (Ellington, Harry Carney, Irving Mills) - 5:52  
 "Perdido" (Juan Tizol) - 6:49  
 "I'm Beginning to See the Light" (Ellington, Don George, Johnny Hodges, Harry James) - 2:06  
 "Midriff" (Billy Strayhorn) - 4:29  
 "It Don't Mean a Thing (If It Ain't Got That Swing)" (Ellington, Mills) - 4:33  
 "Main Stem" - 4:15  
 "Take the "A" Train" (Strayhorn) - 5:33  
 "Lullaby of Birdland" (George Shearing) - 5:23 Bonus track on CD reissue 
 "The Wailer" (Gerald Wilson) - 4:25 Bonus track on CD reissue  
 "Dreamy Sort of Thing" (Strayhorn) - 3:56 Bonus track on CD reissue  
 "Lullaby of Birdland" [alternate take] (Shearing) - 5:27 Bonus track on CD reissue  
 "Harlem Air Shaft" - 4:03 Bonus track on CD reissue  
Recorded at Radio Recorders, Los Angeles on May 31, 1960 (tracks 4 & 5), June 2, 1960 (track 7), June 20, 1960 (tracks 3, 10, 12 & 13), June 22 (track 8), June 28, 1960 (tracks 6 & 9), June 29, 1960 (track 2) & June 30, 1960 (tracks 1 & 11) and March 3, 1961 (track 14)

Personnel
Duke Ellington – piano 
Ray Nance, Willie Cook, Andres Meringuito, Eddy Mullins, Gerald Wilson - trumpet
Lawrence Brown, Britt Woodman, Booty Wood - trombone
Juan Tizol - valve trombone
Jimmy Hamilton - clarinet, tenor saxophone
Johnny Hodges - alto saxophone
Russell Procope - alto saxophone, clarinet
Paul Gonsalves - tenor saxophone
Harry Carney - baritone saxophone, clarinet, bass clarinet
Aaron Bell - bass 
Sam Woodyard - drums
Gerald Wilson - arrangement, Perdido
W. A. Mathieu, as Bill Mathieu - arrangement, I'm Beginning to See the Light, It Don't Mean a Thing

References

Columbia Records albums
Duke Ellington albums
1960 albums